On 11 May 2013, the election day for Pakistan general election several bombings took place across the country. The bombings were targeted against offices of the Awami National Party. Another blast was in Quaidabad near a polling station. The blast killed over 10 people.

References

2013 murders in Pakistan
21st-century mass murder in Pakistan
2013 Pakistani general election
Mass murder in 2013
Improvised explosive device bombings in Pakistan
Terrorist incidents in Pakistan in 2013
Electoral violence in Pakistan
Building bombings in Pakistan